Freetown, officially known as FreeTown, is a town in Antigua, and the home of Dunae. It is located in the southeast of the island, on a peninsula between Willoughby Bay to the south and Nonsuch Bay to the north.

It is a sparsely populated area with one beach – Half Moon Bay with its beautiful white and pink sand.

Climate 
Freetown is often ranked as the coldest town in Antigua and Barbuda, often achieving low temperatures of 15 degrees Celsius in the winter.

Demographics 
Freetown has four enumeration districts.

 60600 FreeTown-North 
 60700 FreeTown-West 
 60800 FreeTown-South
 61700 Mill Reef_Half Moon Bay

Census Data

References

Populated places in Antigua and Barbuda
Saint Philip Parish, Antigua and Barbuda